Christopher Bradley, formerly known as Bolt and Maverick, is a fictional character appearing in American comic books published by Marvel Comics, in particular those featuring the X-Men. He is a young mutant who first appeared in X-Men Unlimited #8.

The character has appeared in several X-Men animated series and was portrayed by Dominic Monaghan in the 2009 film, X-Men Origins: Wolverine.

Fictional character biography

Legacy Virus
Chris Bradley was first introduced as a young boy who began suffering from increasingly painful headaches. The headaches resulted from his electrical mutant powers, which manifested and grew out of control in the middle of a class at school, leaving him unconscious. He was rescued by Jean Grey and Gambit, who had been sent by Professor Xavier to keep an eye on him and approach him should his powers reveal themselves. After taking him home, the X-Men offered him training at the Xavier Institute for Higher Learning. At first Chris was reluctant, but after being shunned by his best friend, agreed to join the school.

Chris spent several weeks at the school, quickly developing close friendships with the X-Men, particularly Iceman, whose own youthful personality seemed to connect well with Chris'. However, when the Beast ran a medical test on Chris, it was revealed that he was infected with the Legacy Virus, which would eventually kill him. Chris was afraid of what his future would hold, but Iceman and the other X-Men offered him aid should he ever need it.

During the "X-Men: Zero Tolerance" storyline, in which the mutant hating Bastion began to target the X-Men, they lost touch with Chris. This left Bradley hurt with feelings of abandonment, particularly as his illness was growing steadily worse.

New Warriors/Bolt
He soon found a mentor in Maverick who was also suffering from the Legacy Virus. Chris stayed with him for a while before joining the New Warriors. After the break-up of his New Warriors team, he teamed up again with Maverick.

Maverick
When Maverick disappeared and was believed dead, Bolt took the Maverick alias for himself and joined the Underground, a group founded by Cable to battle Weapon X and expose its existence. Following the group's defeat, Chris remained in the Underground, though it was taken over by Marrow and remade into a new incarnation of the extremist mutant supremacist group Gene Nation. Chris did not leave as he wanted to undermine Gene Nation from within and prevent its terrorist attacks, though he was ultimately killed by his former mentor himself, now bearing the codename "Agent Zero", who did not find out Chris had been the new Maverick until it was too late. Disgusted by Agent Zero and not wanting to know his true identity, Chris died in his arms, stating that he took on Maverick's persona in order to ensure that his mentor's name would live on and that he wanted his mentor to be proud of him.

Necrosha
During the events of "Necrosha", Bradley is resurrected via the Transmode Virus to serve as part of Selene's army of deceased mutants. Under Selene and Eli Bard's control, Bradley takes part in an assault on the mutant nation of Utopia.

Powers and abilities
Chris could absorb ambient charges of static electricity from the atmosphere and be also able to absorb electricity from electricity-generating sources to empower himself. Typically, Chris’ body harmlessly expended this energy; however, he was able to store and release it for a variety of effects, an ability he primarily manifested as devastating, electrical blasts which he fired from his hands, but he could surround himself with an energy shield that shocks anyone who touches it, conduct electricity through metal objects, or short circuit electronic devices as well. When he was fully powered up, his body was surrounded by a blazing aura that obscured his features, giving him the appearance of a being composed of electricity, which manifested as blue flames. When he originally manifested his powers, he surrounded his entire high school in an electrical field, but has not shown that level of power since, being cured of the Legacy Virus (which boosts mutant-power levels while it kills them).

In other media
 Chris Bradley appears in X-Men Origins: Wolverine, portrayed by Dominic Monaghan. This version is an English mutant and member of and pilot for Major William Stryker's Team X with the ability to remotely control and power electricity-powered objects as well as telepathically send and receive radio transmissions. Six years after Team X disbanded, Bradley finds work with a circus in Springfield, Ohio, but is later murdered by Victor Creed for use in Stryker's experiments.
 A young mutant with Chris Bradley's powers created from his genetic code named Bobby appears in Logan, portrayed by Bryant Tardy.

References

External links
 Chris Bradley at Marvel Wiki

Comics characters introduced in 1995
Marvel Comics mutants
Marvel Comics film characters
Fictional characters with electric or magnetic abilities
Characters created by Howard Mackie
X-Men supporting characters